Manouchehr Fasihi (born 24 August 1940) is an Iranian diver. He competed in the men's 3 metre springboard event at the 1964 Summer Olympics. He also won a bronze medal at the 1958 Asian Games in Tokyo.

References

1940 births
Living people
Iranian male divers
Olympic divers of Iran
Divers at the 1964 Summer Olympics
Sportspeople from Tehran
Asian Games medalists in diving
Divers at the 1958 Asian Games
Divers at the 1966 Asian Games
Medalists at the 1958 Asian Games
Asian Games bronze medalists for Iran
20th-century Iranian people
21st-century Iranian people